Thomas Ryther or Rider,  (by 1479-1525 or later), of New Windsor, Berkshire, was an English Member of Parliament.

He was a Member (MP) of the Parliament of England for New Windsor 4 March 1514, 5 February 1515 and 22 December 1515. He was Mayor of Windsor, Berkshire 1512, 1524–5.

References

15th-century births
16th-century deaths
16th-century English people
People from Windsor, Berkshire
Members of the Parliament of England (pre-1707)